Painted is the second studio album by the international rock band Narrows. The album was released on February 28, 2012 through Deathwish Inc. To promote Painted, prior to its release Narrows previewed the tracks "Under the Guillotine" and "Absolute Betrayer". A music video was also made for the song "TB Positive".

In 2011, Narrows guitarist Jodie Cox, who lives in England, was denied access to the United States. Cox's guitar parts were recorded by Wayne Pennell at Bunker Studios in Brentford, England and sent to the rest of the band over the internet. Matt Bayles tracked the rest of the album at Red Room Studio in Seattle, Washington. Cox described the process, which involved communicating with the rest of the band through the online video service Skype, as being "a frustrating and challenging experience."

Track listing
All songs written by Narrows, except for "**** *** ******" written by Boz Boorer and Morrissey.
 "Under the Guillotine" – 3:38
 "TB Positive" – 2:01
 "Absolute Betrayer" – 2:55
 "Greenland" – 8:06
 "'It's the Water'" – 2:10
 "Face Paint" – 2:02
 "Final Mass" – 2:22
 "SST" – 3:26
Vinyl edition bonus track
 "**** *** ******" (hidden track after a locked groove)

Personnel
Painted personnel adapted from vinyl liner notes.

Narrows
 Jodie Cox – guitar
 Ryan Frederiksen – guitar
 Rob Moran – bass guitar
 Sam Stothers – drum kit
 Dave Verellen (credited as "Dr. Dave Verellen") – vocals

Additional musicians
 Matt Bayles – additional guitar on "Greenland" and "SST"
 Josh Billsetin – additional vocals
 Mike Cooper (Roy) – additional vocals
 Ben Verellen (Harkonen, Helms Alee, Roy) – additional vocals

Production
 Matt Bayles – production, engineering, mixing, mastering
 Narrows – production
 Wayne Pennell – additional recording in the UK

Artwork
 Ryan Frederiksen – art direction, design
 David Smith – photography
 Tamera Von Tart – makeup

References

2012 albums
Narrows (band) albums
Deathwish Inc. albums